Rice black-streaked dwarf virus (RBSDV) is a plant pathogenic virus of the family Reoviridae.

External links
ICTVdB - The Universal Virus Database: Rice black-streaked dwarf virus
Family Groups - The Baltimore Method

Viral plant pathogens and diseases
Fijiviruses